Hugh Ragin is an American jazz trumpeter.

Career
Ragin was born in Honolulu, Hawaii and raised in Houston, Texas, and began playing trumpet in his early teens, taking lessons in classical music, and was a member of the Houston All-City High School Orchestra. He received a degree in music education from the University of Houston and a degree in classical trumpet performance from Colorado State University. He continued his education in 1978 at the Creative Music Studio with Roscoe Mitchell. One year later he performed with Mitchell, Wadada Leo Smith, and the Creative Orchestra at the Moers Festival in Germany. He then toured with Anthony Braxton. During the early 1980s he toured with jazz trumpeter Maynard Ferguson. He began an association with David Murray, becoming a member of Murray's band in the 1980s.

Discography

As leader or co-leader
 Team Work (Cecma, 1982) with John Lindberg
 Metaphysical Question (Cecma, 1985)
 An Afternoon in Harlem (Justin Time, 1999)
 Gallery (CIMP, 1999)
 Back to Saturn (Black Saint, 2000)
 Fanfare & Fiesta (Justin Time, 2001)
 Feel the Sunshine (Justin Time, 2002)
 Sound Pictures for Solo Trumpet (Hopscotch, 2002)
 Revelation (Justin Time, 2004)
Source:

As sideman
With Anthony Braxton
 Composition 98 (hat ART, 1981)

With John Lindberg
 Dimension 5 (Black Saint, 1981)

With Roscoe Mitchell
 Sketches from Bamboo (Moers Music, 1979)
 Snurdy McGurdy and Her Dancin' Shoes (Nessa, 1981)
 3 x 4 Eye (Black Saint, 1981)
 Live at the Knitting Factory (Black Saint, 1987)
 Nine to Get Ready (ECM, 1997)
 Duets with Tyshawn Sorey and Special Guest Hugh Ragin (Wide Hive, 2013)
 Bells for the South Side (ECM, 2017)
 and the Art Ensemble of Chicago: We Are On The Edge (A 50th Anniversary Celebration) (Pi, 2019)

With David Murray
 New Life (Black Saint, 1985)
 Hope Scope (Black Saint, 1987)
 Remembrances (DIW, 1990)
 David Murray Big Band (DIW/Columbia, 1991)
 South of the Border (DIW, 1992)
 Picasso (DIW, 1993)
 Dark Star: The Music of the Grateful Dead (Astor Place, 1996)
 Fo Deuk Revue (Justin Time, 1996)
 Speaking in Tongues (Justin Time, 1997)
 Octet Plays Trane (Justin Time 1999)
 Yonn-Dé (Justin Time, 2001)
 Now Is Another Time (Justin Time, 2003)

With RACCA trio
 The Great Expanse (Right Brain Records, 2022) https://www.rightbrainrecords.com/racca
 Four Phase (Kreating SounD, June 2022) https://raccatrio.bandcamp.com/album/four-phase

With SeFa LoCo
 Entanglements (Right Brain Records, 2022) https://www.rightbrainrecords.com/sefaloco
 occurrency (Right Brain Records, 2022) https://www.rightbrainrecords.com/sefaloco

With Fred Wesley
 Comme ci comme ça (1991)
 Swing and be funky (1993)

References

 

American jazz trumpeters
American male trumpeters
1951 births
Living people
University of Houston alumni
Colorado State University alumni
CIMP artists
21st-century trumpeters
21st-century American male musicians
American male jazz musicians
Justin Time Records artists
Musicians from Honolulu